City Village is a neighborhood in Columbus, Georgia. It is located north of the central business district of Downtown, and south of Bibb City.

Columbus metropolitan area, Georgia
Neighborhoods in Columbus, Georgia